Beta Theta Pi Fraternity House, also known as the Eta chapter of Beta Theta Pi, is a historic fraternity house located at Chapel Hill, Orange County, North Carolina.  It was built in 1929, and consists of a 2 1/2-story, five bay by three bay, brick main block flanked by lower 2 1/2-story, brick wings with gambrel roofs.  The house is in the Southern Colonial Revival style and features a full-width, flat-roof portico with Doric order columns. The Eta Chapter was first active at the University of North Carolina at Chapel Hill from 1852 to 1859, then reestablished in 1884.

It was listed on the National Register of Historic Places in 2005.

References

Residential buildings on the National Register of Historic Places in North Carolina
Colonial Revival architecture in North Carolina
Residential buildings completed in 1929
Buildings and structures in Chapel Hill-Carrboro, North Carolina
National Register of Historic Places in Orange County, North Carolina
Fraternity and sorority houses